Caudal may refer to:

Anatomy
 Caudal (anatomical term) (from Latin cauda; tail), used to describe how close something is to the trailing end of an organism
 Caudal artery, the portion of the dorsal aorta of a vertebrate that passes into the tail
 Caudal cell mass, the aggregate of undifferentiated cells at the caudal end on the spine
 Caudal fin, the tail fin of a fish
 Caudal vertebrae, that make up the tail of tailed animals

Places
 Caudal (comarca), an administrative division of Asturias, Spain
 Caudal (river), in northern Spain
 Caudal Hills, Antarctica

Other uses
 Caudal (protein), a family of homeobox transcription factors 
 Anne-Lise Caudal (born 1984), a French golfer

See also

Cauda (disambiguation)